Matthew Savoie may refer to:
 Matthew Savoie (figure skater)
 Matthew Savoie (ice hockey)